Ingrid St-Pierre (born in 1985) is a French Canadian singer-songwriter from Quebec.

Biography 
Ingrid St-Pierre was born and raised in Cabano, a town within the Bas-Saint-Laurent region of Quebec, Canada. Her father is a businessman while her mother is a painter and an artist. Since a young age, Ingrid took piano and Gregorian classical singing classes.  At age 17, she left her hometown to go study in Quebec City. She later on settled in Trois-Rivières where she decided to study psychology. Ultimately, she left university to pursue a musical career.

Musical career 
She joined independent Canadian record label "La Tribu" in 2011 and still works with them to this day

She released her first album Petite mam’zelle de chemin on May 24, 2011. The album sold relatively well in Quebec and it even won St-Pierre her first nomination for the Breakthrough Award at the ADISQ, the main awards for music in Quebec. Ingrid was called Francophone discovery by the Public Francophone Radio Association. On January 20, 2012, Ingrid released a music video for her song "Ficelles" on YouTube, a video on her Grandmother and her struggle with Alzheimer's which now has nearly three million views.  In 2012, she released her second album L’Escapade, receiving three ADISQ nominations: album of the year, singer-songwriter of the year and the Contemporary adult award, an award she lost to Celine Dion. After a three-year hiatus due to personal reasons, during which St-Pierre suffered a miscarriage in 2014, she released her third album Tokyo in November 2015.  Ingrid with her partner and drummer, Liu-Kong Ha, had a baby boy on September 9, 2015 who they decided to name  Polo. Her son was conceived in Tokyo hence the name she gave to her new album. Later that year, she was nominated once again for the ADISQ Gala and finally won her first Felix for artist of the year. Following her vocality on the subject, The Federation of Quebec Alzheimer's society named Ingrid St-Pierre their Spokesperson for the Alzheimer's movement.

Ingrid is presently on tour for her third album Tokyo since January 2016. She also joined the Canadian celebrity dancing show Les Dieux de la danse with her long-time friend, singer and television host Joël Legendre.

Discography

2011 : Ma petite mam’zelle de chemin 
 Mercure au Chrome et p’tits pansements
 Homéostasie crânienne
 Colle sur tes papilles
 Desjardins
 Les froufrous blancs
 Les Ex
 Pates au basilic
 Sous les Aquarelles
 Une luciole sur un high
 T'se
 Ficelles

2012 : L’escapade 
 La chocolaterie
 La planque a libellules
 La courte échelle
 L’escapade
 Valentine
 Coin Livernoche
 Deltaplane
 En p’tit bonhomme
 Les elles

2015 : Tokyo 
 Tokyo Jelly Bean
 La ballerine
 63 Rue Leman
 Place Royale
 La dentellière
 Lucie
 Les loups pastel
 Les aéronefs
 Monoplace
 L’éloge des dernières fois

2019 : Petite Plage 
 À la mer
 Les joailliers
 Les éléphants Massaï
 Les amoureux scaphandres
 Les épousailles
 La vie devant
 Sac banane
 La lumineuse (lettre à mon fils)
 L'enneigée

Videography 
 Desjardins (August 11, 2011), Directed by Philippe Arsenault
 Ficelles (January 20, 2012). Directed by Valerie Dupras and Jean-Francois Levesque
 Valentine (March 28, 2013) Directed by Sebastien Gagne
 Feu de Bengale (October 11, 2013) Directed by Sebastien Gagne
 La planque à libellules (December 6, 2013) Jean-Francois Blais
 Tokyo Jellybean (September 21, 2016) Directed by Pierre Alexandre Gerard

References

1985 births
Living people
Canadian women singer-songwriters
Canadian singer-songwriters
Singers from Quebec
Songwriters from Quebec
21st-century Canadian women singers
French-language singers of Canada